James Ryan Ho, better known as Malay, is an American record producer, songwriter, and audio engineer. He is a Grammy Award winner.

Early life and career

James Ho was born to a Malaysian father and white mother.

Malay has produced for a number of artists. He was producer for John Legend in the album Evolver (2008) and Frank Ocean in channel ORANGE (2012); the latter won a number of accolades, including the Grammy Award for Best Urban Contemporary Album, as well as 2013 Grammy nominations for Album of the Year, Best New Artist, and Record of the Year for "Thinkin Bout You". He has also produced for Zayn's debut album Mind of Mine (2016), as well as Stacy Barthe, Fantasia, Linus Young, and Yelawolf.

Malay also went on to co-found his own record label in 2016, named Britannia Row Recordings, in partnership with BMG. In 2018, the label announced its first signing, The Parlor Mob.

Discography

References

External links
Twitter
Instagram

American record producers
Living people
American musicians of Chinese descent
American people of Malaysian descent
Year of birth missing (living people)